Puttur Assembly constituency is an assembly constituency of the Karnataka Legislative Assembly. It is one of the 8 constituencies in the Dakshina Kannada.

Overview
Earlier it was  part of the Mangalore Lok Sabha constituency. Now it is a part of Dakshina Kannada Lok Sabha constituency.

Members of Legislative Assembly

Madras State
1951: K. Gowda Venkataramana, Indian National Congress
1951: K. Iswara, Indian National Congress

Mysore State
1957: Gowda Venkataramana K, Indian National Congress
1957: Naik Subbaya, Indian National Congress
1962: K. Venkatramana Gowda, Indian National Congress
1967: B. Vittaldas Shetty, Indian National Congress
1972: A. Shanker Alva, Indian National Congress

Karnataka State

Election results

1952

See also
 List of constituencies of Karnataka Legislative Assembly

References

 

Dakshina Kannada district
Assembly constituencies of Karnataka